William Brack (born 26 December 1935) is a Canadian former racing driver. Brack raced in Formula One and the Atlantic Championship. 

Born in Toronto, Ontario, Canada, Brack originally became involved in auto racing in the early 1960s, in the form of ice-racing Minis (using a company car) in Huntsville, Ontario. He went on to purchase Gordon Brown's own racing Mini (Gord Brown being another Mini racer as well as dealer of British cars at Glendale Suburban Motors in Brampton.)

Brack subsequently became a Formula One driver who raced for the Lotus and BRM teams. After Formula One he was successful in Atlantic Championship in the mid-1970s, having won the Canadian Formula Atlantic Championships in three successive years (1973, 1974, 1975) before retiring from racing to open a Daimler Chrysler dealership (Downtown Chrysler) near the Canadian National Exhibition in Toronto. He is not related to the Swedish race car driver Kenny Bräck.

Complete Formula One results
(key)

References

Profile at grandprix.com

External links
Interview at Canadianracer.com

1935 births
Living people
Atlantic Championship drivers
BRM Formula One drivers
Canadian Formula One drivers
Racing drivers from Ontario
Sportspeople from Toronto
Team Lotus Formula One drivers
Trans-Am Series drivers